{
  "type": "ExternalData",
  "service": "geoshape",
  "ids": "Q48725880",
  "properties": {
    "title": "Sultan Abdul Halim Ferry Terminal",
    "description": "",
  }
}

The Sultan Abdul Halim Ferry Terminal is a ferry slip within Butterworth in Penang, Malaysia. This docking facility is used for Penang Ferry services between Butterworth and the city of George Town on Penang Island.

In addition to ferry services, the ferry terminal is located adjacent to both Penang Sentral and the Butterworth railway station. This allows ferry commuters to choose between bus and train transportation modes to various destinations within Seberang Perai, as well as Peninsular Malaysia, Singapore and Thailand.

History 
The Sultan Abdul Halim Ferry Terminal was constructed to replace Mitchell's Pier, which had been built at the start of the 20th century. In the past, Mitchell's Pier was the landing point for the cross-strait ferries that linked Butterworth with George Town.

The present-day ferry terminal was named after the then Sultan of neighbouring Kedah, Sultan Abdul Halim. He was also twice elected as the King of Malaysia (Malay: Yang di-Pertuan Agong) - between 1970 and 1975, and between 2011 and 2016.

In 1988, the Sultan Abdul Halim Ferry Terminal suffered structural failure due to overloading and collapsed, claiming the lives of 32 people.

See also 
 Penang ferry service
 George Town Ferry Terminal

References 

Ferry terminals in Malaysia
North Seberang Perai District
Transport in Penang